IXS may refer to:

 IXS, IATA code for Silchar Airport in Assam, India
 IXS Enterprise, a conceptual interstellar faster-than-light spacecraft designed by NASA scientist Dr. Harold G. White
 Inelastic X-ray scattering (IXS)